Peter Laister (May 12, 1927 – October 24, 2002) was a prominent Anglo-Catholic priest in the twentieth century. He was born and died in London.

Laister trained for ordination at Saint David's Theological College, Lampeter, Wales and at St. Stephen's House, Oxford, being made a deacon in 1956 and priest in 1957. He began his ministry as a curate in the Diocese of Chelmsford, 1956–60. He served as a Royal Navy Chaplain, 1960–65; Curate of Saint Mary Magdalene, Munster Square, London, 1965–66; Vicar of Our Most Holy Redeemer with St Philip, Clerkenwell, 1970–86; Rector of S. Clement's Church, Philadelphia, 1986–1993, later rector emeritus.

He was a member of the American council of the Guild of All Souls 1986–1992 and served as president of the English branch of the GAS.

References
 Panegyric Remarks by the Rt Rev'd Ambrose Weekes, CB, at Fr Laister's Requiem Mass 12 November 2002 at the Church of Our Most Holy Redeemer, London
Michael Farrer, Peter Laister: A Memoir (2011)
Obituary, The Living Church, January 12, 2003, p. 37.

1927 births
2002 deaths
20th-century English Anglican priests
Alumni of St Stephen's House, Oxford
Anglo-Catholic clergy